The Clydesdale Bank £10 note, also known informally as a tenner, is a sterling banknote. It is the second smallest denomination of banknote issued by the Clydesdale Bank. The current polymer note, first issued in 2017, bears an image of Scottish poet Robert Burns on the obverse and a vignette of the Old and New Towns of Edinburgh on the reverse.

History
The Clydesdale Bank began issuing £10 notes in 1838, the same year as the bank's founding. Early banknotes were monochrome, and printed on one side only. The issuing of banknotes by Scottish banks was regulated by the Banknote (Scotland) Act 1845 until it was superseded by the Banking Act 2009. Though strictly not legal tender in Scotland, Scottish banknotes are nevertheless legal currency and are generally accepted throughout the United Kingdom. Scottish banknotes are fully backed such that holders have the same level of protection as those holding genuine Bank of England notes. The £10 note is currently the second smallest denomination of banknote issued by the Clydesdale Bank.

Scottish banknotes are not withdrawn in the same manner as Bank of England notes, and therefore several different versions of the Clydesdale ten pound note may be encountered. The "Famous Scots" issue of the £10 note featuring missionary Mary Slessor was introduced in 1997. On the reverse of this note are a series of images connected to Slessor's work, including a map of the area in which she worked and a vignette showing her work with children. In 2006 a version of the Slessor note marking the bank's sponsorship of Scotland's Commonwealth Games team was produced. This note has an alternate reverse displaying a montage of sporting events. The "World Heritage" series £10 note was introduced in 2009. This note featured a portrait of Scottish poet Robert Burns on the front, and the Old Town and New Town of Edinburgh on the back. A new polymer note went into circulation in 2017, replacing previous cotton issues. This new note continued to feature Robert Burns on the front and views of Edinburgh, including Edinburgh Castle, on the back. The Committee of Scottish Bankers encouraged the public to spend or exchange older, non-polymer ten pound notes before 1 March 2018.

Designs

References

External links

The Committee of Scottish Bankers website

Banknotes of Scotland
Ten-base-unit banknotes
Clydesdale Bank